Elias Álvares Lobo (9 August 1834 – 15 December 1901) was a Brazilian composer.

Lobo was born in Itu, Brazil. He wrote the first Brazilian opera in the Portuguese language, A Noite de São João (Saint John's Party Night).

References

1834 births
1901 deaths
Brazilian classical composers
Brazilian male composers
Romantic composers
Brazilian opera composers
Place of death missing
Male classical composers
People from Itu, São Paulo
19th-century Brazilian male musicians
20th-century male musicians